Brainstorm is a monthly trade publication for the South African technology sector published by technology media house ITWeb. The magazine was started in 2001. The founders are two Serbian migrated to South Africa, Branko Brkic and Jovan Regasek. Branko Brkic is also the founding editor of the magazine. In November 2014 Jane Steinacker was appointed the editor. Sister publication of the magazine is iWeek.

References

External links
Official website

2001 establishments in South Africa
English-language magazines published in South Africa
Magazines established in 2001
Magazines published in South Africa
Monthly magazines published in South Africa
Professional and trade magazines